Ethiopian music is a term that can mean any music of Ethiopian origin, however, often it is applied to a genre, a distinct modal system that is pentatonic, with characteristically long intervals between some notes.

Three additional modes are variations on the above: tezeta minor, bati major, and bati minor. Some songs take the name of their qenet, such as tizita, a song of reminiscence. When played on traditional instruments, these modes are generally not tempered (that is, the pitches may deviate slightly from the Western-tempered tuning system), but when played on Western instruments such as pianos and guitars, they are played using the Western-tempered tuning system.

Music in the Ethiopian highlands is generally monophonic or heterophonic. In certain southern areas, some music is polyphonic. Dorze polyphonic singing (edho) may employ up to five parts; Majangir, four parts.

Musical instruments

Chordophones

In the highlands, traditional string instruments include the :masenqo (also known as ), a one-string bowed :lute; the :krar (also known as ), a six-string :lyre; and the :begena, a large ten-string lyre.
The  (a five-string lyre) and :musical bows (including an unusual three-string variant) are among the chordophones found in the south.

Aerophones
The  is a bamboo flute that is common in the highlands. These may be metal (generally found in the north) or bamboo (in the south). The Konso and other people in the south play , or pan flutes. It has 6 holes.

Idiophones
In the Ethiopian Orthodox Church, liturgical music employs the senasel (a sistrum). Additionally, the clergy will use walking stick, called mequamia, to maintain rhythm. They are made from stone slabs or pieces of wood. The , a lamellophone, is used among the Nuer, Anuak, Majangir, Surma, and other Nilotic groups. Metal leg rattles are common throughout the south.

Membranophones
The  is a large hand drum used in the Orthodox Christian liturgy. Smaller kebero drums may be used in secular celebrations. The , played with a curved stick, is usually found in a secular context such as royal functions or the announcement of proclamations, though it has a liturgical function among the Beta Israel.

Religious and secular music
Religious music is very important and plays significant role to Ethiopian Orthodox society. The term mezmur is instinctively denotes an Ethiopian Orthodox Tewahedo music. There are also wide range of Islamic music. Protestant music also plays a dominant role since booming its distribution via CDs in 2000s, and recently it evolves from digital downloads.
 
Some Ethiopian religious music has an ancient Christian element, traced to Yared, who lived during the reign of Emperor Gebre Meskel (Son of Kaleb of Aksumite Empire) in the 6th century. Yared was considered the father of Ethiopian-Eritrean traditional music as well as he composed chant or Zema and the use in liturgical music. Zema is divided into three chant modes: Ge'ez, Ezel and Araray. Manzuma developed around 1907. Sung in Amharic and Oromo most notably in Dire Dawa, Harar and Jimma where Ethiopian Muslims reside.  In the Ethiopian Highlands, traditional secular music is played by mostly itinerant musicians called , who are regarded with respect in Ethiopian society.

Popular music

Ethiopia is a musically traditional country. Popular music is played, recorded and listened to, but most musicians also sing traditional songs, and most audiences choose to listen to both popular and traditional styles. A long-standing popular musical tradition in Ethiopia was that of brass bands, imported from Jerusalem in the form of forty Armenian orphans (Arba Lijoch) during the reign of Haile Selassie. This band, which arrived in Addis Ababa on 6 September 1924, became the first official orchestra of Ethiopia. By the end of World War II, large orchestras accompanied singers; the most prominent orchestras were the Army Band, Police Band, and Imperial Bodyguard Band.

From the 1950s to the 1970s, Ethiopian popular musicians included Mahmoud Ahmed, Alemayehu Eshete, Hirut Bekele, Ali Birra, Ayalew Mesfin, Kiros Alemayehu, Muluken Melesse and Tilahun Gessesse, while popular folk musicians included Alemu Aga, Kassa Tessema, Ketema Makonnen, Asnaketch Worku, and Mary Armede.  Perhaps the most influential musician of the period, however, was Ethio-jazz innovator Mulatu Astatke.  Amha Records, Kaifa Records, and Philips-Ethiopia were prominent Ethiopian record labels during this era.  Since 1997, Buda Musique's Éthiopiques series  has compiled many of these singles and albums on compact disc.

During the 1980s, the Derg controlled Ethiopia, and emigration became almost impossible. Musicians during this period included Ethio Stars, Walias Band and Roha Band, though the singer Neway Debebe was most popular.

Contemporary scene

The most prominent internationally acclaimed singers are Aster Aweke, Alemayehu Eshete, Gigi, Teddy Afro, Tilahun Gessesse and Mahmoud Ahmed. Tilahun Gessesse was popular through 20th-century and nicknamed "The Voice" due to his prolong tenor vocal. In 2001, Teddy Afro debut his album Abugida and quickly become famous singer in his generation, nicknamed "Blatenaw" (English: The boy). Some commentators also compare Teddy Afro with Tilahun Gessesse by musical style and patriotic sentiments. Through her performing with prominent Western jazz musicians such as Bill Laswell (who is also her husband) and Herbie Hancock, Gigi has brought Ethiopian music to popular attention, especially in the United States, where she now lives. Through her 1999 album Hagere and "Abebayehosh", Aster Aweke is renowned for her voice that attracted broader audience.

Another noteworthy singer is Neway Debebe, who was very popular among the youth of the 1980s and early 1990s with such songs as "Yetekemt Abeba," "Metekatun Ateye," "Safsaf," and "Gedam" – among others. Abatte Barihun has exemplified all four main  on his 2005 album Ras Deshen.

Éthiopiques producer Francis Falceto criticizes contemporary Ethiopian music for eschewing traditional instruments and ensemble playing in favor of one-man bands using synthesizers. Harvard University professor Kay Kaufman Shelemay, on the other hand, maintains that there is genuine creativity in the contemporary music scene. She further points out that Ethiopian music is not alone in shifting to electronically produced music, a point that Falceto acknowledges.

In the West, several bands were also created in recent years to play music inspired by the Éthiopiques series and other examples of Ethiopian music of the '60s and '70s. They include Boston's Either/Orchestra, Imperial Tiger Orchestra (Switzerland), and Le Tigre des platanes (France).

New genres of music, popular in western countries, such as EDM, rock and hip hop have been introduced in recent years. Musical acts like Jano Band play a new style of music progressive rock, with a mix of Ethiopian music. Hip hop music started influencing Ethiopian music in the early to mid 2000s and culminated with the creation of Ethiopian hip hop, rhymed in the native Amharic language. The earliest and most influential rappers of the hip hop were Teddy Yo and Lij Michael, with the latter being more commercially successful. The success of both Jano Band and Lij Michael led to their inclusion in the 2017 edition of Coke Studio Africa
The electronic dance music in Ethiopia was not fully developed until mid-2010, although some electronic music employment with hip hop element began in the 2000s. 
In 2018, a DJ and recording artist named Rophnan introduced the country to his own version of electronic dance music, winning the album of the year award and changing the mainstream music scene further.

Record labels
Since 2016, the most used record label is Hope Music Entertainment, while Minew Shewa Entertainment and Admas Music are used as secondary labels. Hope Music Entertainment, Minew Shewa Entertainment and Dire Tube become the country's online streaming media in recent years. Dire Tube typically recovers older recordings and music videos. The most notable label throughout the 2000s is Nahom Records, which is still active.

See also
Music and politics in Ethiopia
Qene

References

Ethiopian music